Evangelicals Now is a monthly evangelical Christian newspaper based in Surrey, England. The newspaper was started in 1986 by Bob Horn (with the support of Sir Fred Catherwood) and the current editor is David Baker, who is also the Rector of East Dean Church near Eastbourne. A readers survey in 2002 suggested that the newspaper has about 6,500 readers — mainly from Evangelical Free, Baptist, and Church of England churches. The paper's website includes a searchable on-line archive of all articles from 1996 onwards.

The paper takes a Reformed theological position and is one of two in the United Kingdom that cater for this readership. It has a slightly broader approach than its counterpart (Evangelical Times), whilst remaining firmly within the conservative evangelical wing of the church.

References

External links
 

Monthly magazines published in the United Kingdom
Religious magazines published in the United Kingdom
Christian magazines
Evangelical organizations established in the 20th century
Evangelicalism in the United Kingdom
Magazines established in 1986
Mass media in Surrey